Tjeerd Rienk van Dekken (born 14 May 1967) is a Dutch politician and former communication employee. As a member of the Labour Party (Partij van de Arbeid) he was an MP between 17 June 2010 and 23 March 2017. He focuses on matters of sports policy and decline of population in more rural regions.

From 1994 to 1998 he was chairman of the Young Socialists (Jonge Socialisten). Van Dekken performed several communication jobs. From 2006 to 2010 he had a communication firm of his own.

References

External links 
 
  Tjeerd van Dekken at the website of the Labour Party
  Tjeerd van Dekken at the website of the House of Representatives

1967 births
21st-century Dutch politicians
Labour Party (Netherlands) politicians
Living people
Members of the House of Representatives (Netherlands)
People from Marum